Panoramical is a 2015 video game by Fernando Ramallo and David Kanaga. The player explores and manipulates 15 abstract landscapes using gamepad, mouse, joystick, or MIDI controls. The game's guest composers include Baiyon and Doseone. A Pro license of the game is marketed for professional DJs to play in public. Panoramical development was supported by Finji, Indie Fund, and Polytron.

References

Further reading

External links 

 

2015 video games
MacOS games
Single-player video games
Indie video games
Interactive art
Adventure games
Games financed by Indie Fund
Windows games